Tak and the Power of Juju is an action-adventure platforming video game developed by Avalanche Software and published by THQ for the GameCube, PlayStation 2 and Game Boy Advance. The game was released in North America on October 15, 2003 and in Europe on March 12, 2004.

Gameplay
The gameplay mostly consists of platforming obstacles and puzzles.  The player has a health-meter represented by the feather on Tak's head. Tak's abilities are jumping, attacking, and a unique feature, the ability to interact with and get past obstacles with the help of animals.

 Orangutans: Bend trees, then release them. If the player is standing on a specific leaf, they will be sent flying. This is usually to cross large gaps and chasms.
 Rhinos: Can be guided to smash obstacles, usually walls, while being ridden by the player.
 Monkeys: If attacked in some way, they will throw a coconut at whatever is nearest to them.
 Emus: Controllable when ridden with a larger jump distance than Tak. 
 Sheep: Can be placed on treadmills to activate primitive contraptions such as doors and simple lifts.

When the player receives the Spirit Rattle, they gain access to the use of "Juju Powers" which are acquired by collecting tokens scattered around the environment. To restore Tak's health and mana the player must collect feathers, which are much more common in the environment than Juju Power tokens. The game heavily features collecting various other items. One of the game's developers said that the gameplay was based on Sly Cooper, the level design on the Jak and Daxter trilogy, and the humor of Ratchet and Clank which are all PlayStation exclusive franchises.

Plot
An ancient prophecy foretells that the Moon Juju, the kind protector of the Pupanunu people, would be weakened by the evil Tlaloc, an embittered Pupanunu shaman, so he could turn the Pupanunu people into sheep as revenge for not being made high shaman in favor of another shaman, Jibolba. The prophecy also mentions a great and mighty warrior trained by the high shaman who would restore the Moon Juju, defeat Tlaloc, and bring peace to the Pupanunu people.

Having escaped Tlaloc's spell, Jibolba believes his apprentice Lok to be the warrior of the prophecy and prepares to send him off; however, it appears that Lok has been turned into a sheep. Jibolba sends his younger apprentice, Tak (voiced by Jason Marsden), to find magical plants and change him back, though it turns out not to be Lok, but his squire Tobar. Jibolba tells Tak to obtain the Spirit Rattle, which allows the wielder to communicate with powerful Juju spirits to assist him, while he finds Lok.

Tak returns with the Rattle to find that Lok has been trampled to death by a herd of sheep. Jibolba has Tak collect 100 magic Yorbels and Lok's spirit from the spirit world, allowing him to successfully resurrect Lok. An unfortunate side-effect of the resurrection, however, is a severe case of diarrhea (or the "Resurrection's Revenge", as Jibolba refers to). Tak obtains the Moon Stones instead while Lok recovers, restoring the Moon Juju to full strength.

The Moon Juju reveals that the warrior of the prophecy is not Lok, but Tak, as he has already fulfilled almost everything the prophecy predicted (much to Jibolba’s chagrin). Using his arsenal of Juju spells, Tak defeats Tlaloc and turns him into a sheep, finally fulfilling the prophecy.

Development
Tak and the Power of Juju was created by John Blackburn, the CEO of Avalanche Software, who first conceived the idea in 1995 before pitching it in 1998. The game was meant to be an organic platformer taking place in a natural world lacking the typical video game conventions with complex puzzles and obstacles that doesn't take itself too seriously at a time where other games were blocky and held the players hand too much with obvious puzzles. The game was developed by Avalanche Software for the PlayStation 2, GameCube, and Game Boy Advance. The game was developed under the aegis of the Nickelodeon television channel and published by THQ, unprecedented at the time because the game was not based on any of its then existing shows or films.

Reception

The game received "mixed or average reviews" on all platforms according to the review aggregation website Metacritic. GameSpot gave both the GameCube and PlayStation 2 versions a 6.8 out of 10, writing, "Tak and the Power of Juju can serve as a decent platformer, but if you're in the market for one, it shouldn't be your first choice."

The game sold more than 1 million units.

Sequels and spin-offs

The game spawned two direct sequels, Tak 2: The Staff of Dreams and Tak: The Great Juju Challenge, as well as two spinoffs based on the Tak television series, Tak and the Guardians of Gross and Tak: Mojo Mistake.

TV series

Tak and the Power of Juju is a CGI television series that debuted on Nickelodeon on August 31, 2007. Tak and the Power of Juju consists of two eleven-minute stories per half-hour episode. It was the first CGI series to be directly produced in-house by Nickelodeon. The series is directed by Mark Risley and Jim Schumann.

The television series tells of Tak and his friend, Jeera, including his master, Jibolba, and other characters. Tak is faced with the responsibilities of being a shaman as he daily has to save his village from villains. The series aired every Saturday and was not as popular as other Nicktoons, and cancelled its run on January 24, 2009, due to low ratings and mixed to negative feedback from critics and viewers alike.

References

External links

 at the Internet Archive

Tak and the Power of Juju evaluated from an anthropological perspective at Ethnography.com

 
2003 video games
3D platform games
Avalanche Software games
Game Boy Advance games
GameCube games
PlayStation 2 games
Single-player video games
THQ games
Video games adapted into television shows
Video games based on Native American mythology
Video games set in forests
Video games about shapeshifting
Video games with pre-rendered 3D graphics
Video games developed in the United States

pt:Tak and the Power of Juju